

Politics, military, and law
 Donald O. Aldridge, U.S. Air Force Lieutenant General
 Marcia M. Anderson, first African-American female to attain rank of major general in the USAR
 Brad Ashford, former member of the U.S. House of Representatives
 Merton W. Baker, U.S. Air Force Major General
 Frank A. Barrett, former governor of Wyoming
 Patrick Bourne, former member of the Nebraska Legislature
 Mike Boyle, former mayor of Omaha, Nebraska
 Albert Brown, 1927, oldest survivor of the Bataan Death March
 John Cavanaugh III, former member of the U.S. House of Representatives
 Ernie Chambers, member of the Nebraska Legislature
 William M. Connolly, justice of the Nebraska Supreme Court
 Barbara Cubin, former member of the U.S. House of Representatives
 Alfonza W. Davis, Tuskegee Airman
 Robert E. Davis, Chief Justice of the Kansas Supreme Court
 Robert V. Denney, former member of the U.S. House of Representatives
 Leo J. Dulacki, U.S. Marine Corps Lieutenant General
 Mike Fahey, former mayor of Omaha, Nebraska
 Mike Friend, former member of the Nebraska Legislature
 Paul Gosar, member of the U.S. House of Representatives
 Roman Hruska, former senator of Nebraska
 Mike Johanns, former Secretary of Agriculture of the United States, former governor of Nebraska, former United States Senator
 Philip M. Klutznick, former United States Secretary of Commerce
 John A. Knebel, former Secretary of Agriculture of the United States
 Steve Lathrop, member of the Nebraska Legislature
 Lormong Lo, former city council president of Omaha City, Nebraska
 Ray Madden, former member of the U.S. House of Representatives
 Francis P. Matthews, former secretary of the U.S. Navy
 Michael McCormack, justice of the Nebraska Supreme Court
 John McKay, former United States Attorney
 Jack R. Miller, former senator of Iowa
 Michael R. Murphy, circuit judge on the United States Court of Appeals for the Tenth Circuit
 Jeremy Nordquist, member of the Nebraska Legislature
 Eugene O'Sullivan, former member of the U.S. House of Representatives
 John Pehle, Executive director of the War Refugee Board in WWII 
 Mike Reasoner, member of the Iowa House of Representatives
 Seth Rich, political activist 
 Leo Ryan, former member of the U.S. House of Representatives
 Symone Sanders, Democratic strategist and spokesperson
 J. Clay Smith Jr., former deputy chief of the Federal Communications Commission, former interim head of the Equal Employment Opportunity Commission, and former dean of Howard University School of Law
 Patrick Sullivan, former member of the Wyoming House of Representatives
 Doug Struyk, member of the Iowa House of Representatives
 Lee Terry, member of the U.S. House of Representatives
 Nancy Thompson, former member of the Nebraska Legislature
 Tom White, member of the Nebraska Legislature
 Edward Zorinsky, former senator of Nebraska
 C. Shannon Bacon, the incumbent chief justice of the New Mexico Supreme Court

Authors, media, and entertainment
 Ron Hansen, novelist, essayist, and professor
 Paul Henderson, reporter for The Seattle Times, winner of the Pulitzer Prize for Investigative Reporting in 1982
 Rachelle Hruska, founder of Guest of a Guest
 James Keogh, executive editor of Time magazine; head of the White House speechwriting staff under Richard M. Nixon
 Matt Maginn, bass player of Cursive
 Michael MacCambridge, author
 Matt Peckham, critic for Time
 Colleen Williams, Los Angeles news anchor
 Mary Alice Williams, former co-anchor of Weekend Today

Business

 Jackie Gaughan, former casino owner
 Cathy Hughes, founder and chairman of Radio One, first African American woman to head a publicly traded corporation, namesake of Howard University's School of Communications

 Don Keough, former president and chief operating officer of Coca-Cola
 Joe Ricketts, founder and former chairman of TD Ameritrade and owner of the Chicago Cubs
 Virginia Lamp Thomas, director of executive branch relations of the Heritage Foundation
 Mark Walter, chief executive officer of Guggenheim Partners and controlling owner of the Los Angeles Dodgers

Science and medicine
 Michael P. Anderson, former NASA astronaut killed in the Space Shuttle Columbia disaster

Religion
 Curtis Guillory, boards of commissions member within the U.S. Conference of Catholic Bishops
 Nancey Murphy, Christian theologian and writer

Athletes

Basketball
 Wally Anderzunas, former NBA player
 Benoit Benjamin, former NBA player
 Rodney Buford, former NBA player
 Justin Carter (born 1987), player for Maccabi Kiryat Gat of the Israeli Premier League
 Bill Fitch, former NBA coach
 Chad Gallagher, former NBA player
Ronnie Harrell (born 1996), basketball player for Hapoel Gilboa Galil of the Israeli Basketball Premier League
 Neil Johnson, former NBA player
 Kyle Korver (born 1981), former NBA player for the Milwaukee Bucks
 Doug McDermott, current NBA player for the San Antonio Spurs; consensus national college player of the year in 2014
 Kevin McKenna, former NBA player
 Justin Patton (born 1997), player for Hapoel Eilat of the Israeli Basketball Premier League
 Bob Portman, former NBA player
 Paul Silas, former NBA player and coach
 Alex Stivrins, former NBA player
Khyri Thomas (born 1996), basketball player for Maccabi Tel Aviv of the Israeli Basketball Premier League and the EuroLeague
 Anthony Tolliver (born 1985), NBA player for the Minnesota Timberwolves
Maurice Watson (born 1993), player for Maccabi Rishon LeZion of the Israeli Basketball Premier League
 Ethan Wragge (born 1990), played in Germany with Gießen 46ers
Marcus Zegarowski (born 1998), current NBA player for the Long Island Nets

Baseball
 Kimera Bartee, former MLB player
 Alan Benes, former MLB player
 Ty Blach, MLB pitcher for the Baltimore Orioles
 Tom Drees, former MLB player
 Bob Gibson, all star  Hall of Fame pitcher with the St. Louis Cardinals, 1959-1975
 Chad Meyers, former MLB player
 Brian O'Connor, head coach, University of Virginia baseball team
 Dennis Rasmussen, former MLB pitcher
 Darin Ruf, former MLB player
 Scott Servais, former MLB  player; current manager of the Seattle Mariners
 Scott Stahoviak, former MLB player
 Pat Venditte, MLB switch pitcher

Soccer

David Abidor (born 1992), soccer player
 Steve Bernal, former MLS player and the 34th overall pick by the Dallas Burn in the 2000 MLS SuperDraft
 Andrew Duran, former MLS player and the 15th overall pick by the Seattle Sounders FC in the 2012 MLS SuperDraft
 Ethan Finlay, current member of the Minnesota United FC and the 10th overall pick in the 2012 MLS SuperDraft
 Andrei Gotsmanov, former member of Minnesota United FC of the North American Soccer League and the 24th overall pick in the 2009 MLS SuperDraft
 Brendan Hines-Ike, current member of the KV Kortrijk
 Brian Holt, current member of the Philadelphia Union
 Greg Jordan, former MLS player and the 32nd overall pick by the Philadelphia Union in the 2012 MLS SuperDraft
 Ryan Junge, former MLS player
 Brian Kamler, former MLS player
 Eric Miller, 5th overall pick in the 2014 MLS SuperDraft
 Brian Mullan, current member of the Colorado Rapids, 9th overall pick in the 2001 MLS SuperDraft, and has made four appearances for the United States national team
 Richard Mulrooney, former MLS player and the 40th overall pick by F.C. Dallas in the 2005 MLS SuperDraft
 Julian Nash, former MLS player
 Andrew Peterson, former MLS player
 Tyler Polak, former MLS player and the 22nd overall pick by the New England Revolution in the 2012 MLS SuperDraft
 Angel Rivillo, 70th overall pick by the Dallas Burn in the 2000 MLS SuperDraft
 Chris Schuler, current member of the Real Salt Lake and the 39th overall pick in the 2010 MLS SuperDraft
 Seth Sinovic, current member of the Sporting Kansas City and the 25th overall pick in the 2010 MLS SuperDraft
 David Wagenfuhr, former MLS player and the 31st overall pick by the Dallas Burn in the 2004 MLS SuperDraft
 David Wright, former member of the Pittsburgh Riverhounds of the USL Professional Division and the 25th overall pick in the 2000 MLS SuperDraft

See also
 Creighton University
 People from Omaha, Nebraska

==References==

Creighton University alumni
 
 
Creighton University